Pertef Pogoni was a 20th-century Albanian politician. 

Born in Gjirokastër in Janina Vilayet in 1888, Pogoni had studied in the Pedagogical Institute in France until 1912 and in 1927 he became General secretary of the Ministry of Public Education in Albania. In 1928 he elaborated the law on the organization of the education. In 1939 he was Minister of Education in the Albanian government under Italy and a member of the Council of State.

References

1888 births
1958 deaths
Mekteb-i Mülkiye alumni
People from Gjirokastër
People from Janina vilayet
Albanian politicians
Government ministers of Albania
Education ministers of Albania
Expatriates from the Ottoman Empire in France